Bridgwater by-election may refer to:

 1918 Bridgwater by-election
 1938 Bridgwater by-election
 1970 Bridgwater by-election